World Power is the debut album by German Eurodance project Snap!, released in May 1990 on Bookmark/Ariola Records. The album received generally positive reviews from music critics, as the project's musical style and its vocalists, Turbo B and Penny Ford, were well received. It also achieved considerable commercial success with the help of four international top-ten hits, including its best-selling single "The Power".

Reception

Commercial performance 
The album reached number seven on Germany's Media Control Charts, number 25 on Australia's ARIA Charts, number four on the Ö3 Austria Top 40, number 20 on the Topplistan chart in Sweden, number four on the Swiss Music Charts, number 10 on the UK Albums Chart, and number 30 on the US Billboard 200 chart. Although it did not chart on the Dutch MegaCharts, it earned gold certification from the NVPI, for sales in excess of 50,000 copies in the Netherlands. World Power has also been certified gold in Australia, Austria, Sweden, the United Kingdom, and the United States, while it has received platinum certifications in both Germany and Switzerland. Worldwide, the album sold in excess of 5 million copies as of June 1992.

Critical response 

Upon its release, World Power received generally positive reviews from music critics. Chicago Tribune writer Mitchell May called it "a dance record you can listen to", noting that "pulsating synth chords, slashing guitar riffs, thundering drums and the gospel-like wails of Penny Ford combine to give Snap a riveting sound". Greg Sandow of Entertainment Weekly called the album "smart dance/rap, full of surprises", giving it an "A-". Robert Christgau also gave World Power an A− rating in his consumer guide for The Village Voice. indicating "the kind of garden-variety good record that is the great luxury of musical micromarketing and overproduction. Anyone open to its aesthetic will enjoy more than half its tracks". Christgau noted it as "in the great transcultural Technotronic tradition" and described its music as "crazy and radio-ready at the same time. Also funny". In a retrospective review, AllMusic writer Andrew Hamilton perceived rapper Turbo B's enunciation as a flaw, but commended his "energy" and singer Penny Ford's vocals.

Track listing

Personnel 
 Artwork – Ariola-Studios, Tom
 Lyrics – Durron Butler (tracks: 3 to 10)
 Music – Benito Benites, John "Virgo" Garrett III
 Original sound – Master Musikproduktion GmbH
 Photography – Markus Löffel
 Producer – Snap!

Charts

Weekly charts

Year-end charts 

Singles — Billboard (United States)

Certifications and sales

References

External links 
 
 World Power at Discogs

1990 debut albums
Electronic albums by German artists
Hip hop albums by German artists
Snap! albums